Live at the Royal Albert Hall is a live album by Paul Weller. The concert was first released on DVD on 27 November 2000, and this live album is the audio of that concert. The track listing for the album runs in a different order to the DVD. The original DVD was also packaged with the album. The album reached #140 in the UK album chart.

Track listing
Disc 1 – DVD
Peacock Suit
Friday Street
He's the Keeper
Back in the Fire
Dust and Rocks
Out of the Sinking
Heavy Soul
Time and Temperance
Frightened
You Do Something to Me
The Changingman
Porcelain Gods
There's No Drinking After You're Dead
As You Lean into the Light
Broken Stones
Picking Up Sticks
Loveless
Woodcutter's Son
 
Disc 2 – CD
The Changingman
Porcelain Gods
You Do Something to Me
Peacock Suit
Out of the Sinking
Friday Street
Broken Stones
Back in the Fire
Loveless
Heavy Soul
Picking Up Sticks
There's No Drinking After You're Dead
He's the Keeper
As You Lean into the Light
Dust and Rocks
Woodcutter's Son
Frightened
Time and Temperance

References 

Live albums recorded at the Royal Albert Hall
2000 live albums
2000 video albums
Live video albums
Paul Weller live albums
Paul Weller video albums
Warner Records live albums
Warner Records video albums